Deh Chal-e Dam-e Ludab (also Romanized as Deh Chāl-e Dam-e Lūdāb; also known as Deh Chāl) is a village in Ludab Rural District, Ludab District, Boyer-Ahmad County, Kohgiluyeh and Boyer-Ahmad Province, Iran. At the 2006 census, its population was 31, in 5 families.

References 

Populated places in Boyer-Ahmad County